Brídín Ní Bhraonáin, professionally known as Brídín Brennan, is an Irish pop singer from Dobhar (Dore), Gweedore, County Donegal. She is the sister of Enya, Moya and Pól Brennan, and has also toured with family-band Clannad.

Her precise birthdate is unknown, but is likely in July 1968. A brief mention in the 21 July 1989 edition of the "Donegal Democrat" newspaper noted that her 21st birthday had occurred "recently."

Her career began when her sister Moya asked her to join as a vocalist at Clannad's live performances.

Over the next seven years she accompanied Clannad on tours in Ireland and abroad, and took part in recording on some of their albums and appeared with Moya Brennan on the television shows Later... with Jools Holland in the UK and The Tonight Show with Jay Leno in the United States.

She went on to work along with her other sisters Olive and Deirdre on Moya Brennan's solo projects, including the first and second solo albums Máire and Misty Eyed Adventures. Brídín went on to record her own album Eyes of Innocence in 2005. The album was only released in Ireland, although it is also available online. Two singles were released from the album for radio play: "Hang On" and "You Can't Hurt Me".

In 2001 she married Cameron Campbell  from Sydney Australia. 
And they have two daughters: Sinéad Campbell, born January 2007 &
Matilda Campbell, born February 2011.

Discography
Albums
Eyes of Innocence (2005)

Singles
"Hang On" (2001)

References

External links
'Face To Face'- Unofficial website of Brídín Brennan

1968 births
Living people
Clannad members
Irish women singers
Irish-language singers
Irish pop singers
Musicians from County Donegal
People from Gweedore